is a Japan Maritime Self-Defense Force naval base with port and military aerodrome  facilities. It is located on Mutsu Bay in the city of Mutsu in the Aomori Prefecture, in extreme northern Honshū, Japan.

History 
On 16 September 1953, the Ōminato District Force was newly formed by the National Safety Agency Coastal Safety Force, the predecessor of the Maritime Self-Defense Force.

On 20 January 1954, the Ōminato Garrison was newly established.

On 9 August 1960, the Self-Defense Forces Ōminato Hospital was opened.

On 15 August 1962, the Ōminato Garrison abolished.

Late of March 2021, with the strengthening of the functions of the Self-Defense Forces Yokosuka Hospital, the Self-Defense Forces Ōminato Hospital would be abolished and reduced to a clinic.

Facilities 
Facilities in Ōminato Naval Base includes:

 Ōminato District Force
 Ōminato Communications Command
 Ōminato Coastal Safety Force
 Ōminato Base Operations Corps
 Ōminato Music Corps
 Ōminato Medic
 Ōminato District Police
 Ōminato Repair Supply Station
 Ōminato Ammunition Maintenance Supply Station
 Self-Defense Force Ōminato Hospital
 Fleet Escort Force

Ōminato Air Base 

The base is currently home for the JMSDF 25th Squadron equipped with Sikorsky SH-60 Seahawk helicopters configured for the anti-submarine warfare role, and assigned to patrols of the Tsugaru Strait. It is also a base of operations for a flight of Sikorsky UH-60 Black Hawk utility helicopters from the JMSDF 73rd Squadron at Tateyama Air Base.

History 
On 16 May 1956, Ōminato Air Corps was formed under the control of the Ōminato District Force.

On 26 March 2008, the Ōminato Air Corps was incorporated into the 21st Air Group under the control of the Air Force and reorganized into the 25th Air Group. The 73rd Air Group Ominato Air Detachment was a new edition.

On 2 April 2018, the 73rd Air Group of Ōminato Air Detachment was abolished.

Units 
The whole air base was under the 25th Air Corps.

 Corps General Affairs Office
 Corporal Chief's Office
 Corps staff room
 251st Squadron: SH-60J / SH-60K (call sign "BATTLEAX")
 251st Maintenance Supply Corps
 Ōminato Air Base Corps

References

External links

 

Japanese airbases
Ominato
Ominato
Mutsu, Aomori
Military installations established in 1953
1953 establishments in Japan